Patricksburg (also Lancaster) is an unincorporated community in eastern Marion Township, Owen County, in the U.S. state of Indiana. It lies along State Road 246, west of the city of Spencer, the county seat of Owen County.  Its elevation is 715 feet (218 m), and it is located at  (39.3155987, -86.9591770).  Although Patricksburg is unincorporated, it has a post office, with the ZIP code of 47455.

History
Patricksburg was originally called Lancaster, and under the latter name was laid out and platted in 1851 by Patrick Sullivan. A post office has been in operation under the name Patricksburg (formerly Patricksburgh) since 1854.

References

Unincorporated communities in Owen County, Indiana
Unincorporated communities in Indiana
Bloomington metropolitan area, Indiana